In ancient Roman religion, Antevorta was a goddess of the future, also known as Porrima. She and her sister Postverta (or Postvorta) were described as companions or siblings of the goddess Carmenta, sometimes referred to as "the Carmentae". They may have originally been two aspects of Carmenta, namely those of her knowledge of the future and the past (compare the two-faced Janus).

Antevorta and Postvorta had two altars in Rome and were invoked by pregnant women as protectors against the dangers of childbirth. Antevorta was said to be present at the birth when the baby was born head-first; Postverta, when the feet of the baby came first.

Star name
Antevorta is an alternative star name for Gamma Virginis.

See also
 Atropos
 Camenae
 List of Roman birth and childhood deities
 Skuld

References

External links
Myth Index - Antevorta

Oracular goddesses
Roman goddesses
Time and fate goddesses